Ghulam Mustafa is a male Muslim given name. It may refer to:

People
Qazi Ghulam Mustafa (died c. 1711), nobleman during the Mughal empire
Golam Mostofa (poet) (1897–1964), Bengali writer and poet
Ghulam Mustafa Tabassum (1899–1978), Indian/Pakistani poet in Urdu, Punjabi, and Persian
Ghulam Mustafa Khan (1912–2005), Pakistani linguist, writer, educationist and Sufi religious leader
 Ghulam Mustafa Guard (also Ghulam Guard; 1925–1978), Indian cricketer
ANM Golam Mostafa (died 1971), Bangladeshi martyred intellectual and journalist
Ghulam Mustafa Jatoi (1931–2009), Pakistani politician
Ghulam Mustafa Khan (singer) (1931–2021), Indian classical musician in the Hindustani tradition
Golam Mustafa (1935–2003), Bangladeshi film actor
Ghulam Mustafa Khar (born 1937), Pakistani politician from Punjab Province
Ghulam Mustafa (Pakistan Army officer), General of the Pakistan Army
Ghulam Mustafa Khan (statistician), Pakistani cricket administrator
Ghulam Mustafa Bhat, Indian mayor of Srinagar
Golam Mostafa Khan (1940–2022), Bangladeshi dance artist

Entertainment
Ghulam-E-Mustafa, Indian film

See also
Ghulam
Mustafa